Albraunia is a genus of flowering plants belonging to the family Plantaginaceae.

Its native range is Iran and Iraq.

Species:

Albraunia foveopilosa 
Albraunia fugax 
Albraunia psilosperma

References

Plantaginaceae
Plantaginaceae genera